"Eleanor" is a customized 1971 Ford Mustang Sportsroof (redressed as 1973) that is featured in independent filmmaker H. B. "Toby" Halicki's 1974 film Gone in 60 Seconds. The Eleanor name is also used in the 2000 remake for a customized Shelby Mustang GT500.

Eleanor (in 1974 film)
Though four Mustangs are portrayed in the film as "Eleanor" targets, only two cars were used for filming the movie, with license plates and tires alternated as necessary. Of these two, one car was modified for the stunt driving necessitated by the final chase and wrecked in said process, while the other was kept intact for all external "beauty shots". The latter car was also used for all but two interior shots.

Prepping the two 1971 Mustangs for the film
Both 1971 Mustang Sportsroofs used in the film (neither car has been proven to be a Mach 1, as often assumed) were bought in 1971, but - as it was three years before Halicki could raise sufficient funds to start filming - each car was facelifted with 1973 grilles for the film. Both cars retain their 1971 front bumper and valance panels, as retrofitting the 1973 parts to the car would have required swapping the fenders as well.

As with the liberties taken with the body modifications, Halicki's paint scheme on both cars were similar - but not identical - to Ford factory offerings. Both cars received blackout treatment to the lower bodyside - resembling Mach 1's and base models equipped with the Exterior Decor Group - and a unique blackout treatment to the standard hood; not seen on any factory 1971-1973 Mustang. Additionally, neither car wears any identifiable badging spelling the "Mustang" name in type, though the pony badge and "Ford Motor Company" hubcaps are visible in the film.

Despite rumors that both cars were painted in Ford's Medium Yellow Gold, Halicki, in a 1974 interview, stated that the cars were painted "generic school bus yellow" to save money.

Stunt Eleanor
The modified car required 250 hours of labor before it was ready for the film. All body panels were removed in order to install a roll cage throughout the Mustang's stock unibody. The transmission was also chained in for safety. An adjustable camera rig was mounted in the back seat to capture footage from the internal "driver's point of view".

The wrecked Eleanor was equipped with a base interior and no instrumentation package, but utilized seats from the Mustang's deluxe interior package; sourced from the beauty car. Conversely, the beauty car had deluxe interior, with the standard seats from the stunt car swapped into it.

Other safety modifications included:

 Heavy duty Simpson shoulder harness
 Deadbolt door locks
 Aftermarket hood pins
 24-volt electrical system
 On-board first-aid kit
 Electrical kill switches
 Individual locking rear brakes
 Fish plating of the undercarriage - 3" x 3/8" steel

The interior of the stunt car is seen only once in the film, when Halicki - as Maindrian Pace - places his hands against the windshield when cornered by the Long Beach police. The rollcage is clearly visible against the A-pillar. All other interior shots were executed with the "beauty" car, generally on alternate filming dates.

The stunt car survives to this day, despite two serious incidents during filming.

The first occurred during a stunt wherein "Eleanor" cuts across multiple lanes of freeway traffic. The stunt driver leading the "traffic" overshot his mark during the take, clipping the Mustang and causing it to careen into a nearby light pole. Halicki was rendered unconscious from the impact, but filming resumed the following week - utilizing this accident as part of the final film. Halicki's first words - upon regaining consciousness - were "Did we get coverage?"

Following the incident with the light pole, Halicki compressed multiple vertebrae after performing the impressive 128-foot jump in the closing minutes of the film. The modified Mustang survived, despite  the rough nose landing.

Beauty Eleanor
The second car was left absolutely stock - as noted by cinematographer Jack Vacek in the film's DVD commentary - and was not modified extensively other than the obligatory matching paint job, grille change, and seat swap with the stunt car.

Though this car was not damaged during filming, Halicki said (in 1974, at the film's premiere) that the car was crushed.

Eleanor (2000 film)

In 1995, Denice Halicki, H.B. Halicki's widow, licensed the rights of the 1974 film to Disney for a remake of the same name. The new 2000 Gone in 60 Seconds film, produced by Jerry Bruckheimer, features Nicolas Cage as master auto thief Randall "Memphis" Raines. Both films share plot similarities about a crew of thieves who steal a large order of cars (48 in the original, 50 in the 2000 film) and deliver them to the Long Beach docks. Once again, the "Eleanor" name is given to the film's featured car; now a Dupont Pepper Grey 1967 Ford Mustang fastback, depicted as a Shelby GT500, with a customized body kit designed by Steve Stanford.

Screen-used vehicles
Depending on the source, either eleven or twelve cars were built by Cinema Vehicle Services for the film (not including CVS's creation of one additional Eleanor clone - with a Ford 428 - for producer Bruckheimer). Nine were shells, and three were built as fully functional vehicles. Seven were reported to have "survived the filming [and] made it back to Cinema Vehicle Services" according to research by Mustangandfords.com.

Of the surviving vehicles, three cars have been offered to the public with claims of originality and screen-use in the film, as follows:

All three claim to be functional builds for the film. Whether the two wrecked cars were rebuilt - or whether surviving shells were built up into functional cars - remains unknown and unpublicized.

A fourth car, VIN #7F02C229830, last offered for sale in Dubai, also claims originality to the film. This car has not been authenticated.

Reproductions
Between 2007 and 2009, Classic Recreations manufactured reproductions of the 2000 film's Eleanor Mustang under license by Halicki Films/Eleanor Licensing. After two years Classic Recreations terminated the licensing agreement. Classic Recreations produced two models of the Eleanor Mustang (535 model, 750 model).

Denice Halicki claimed to own the copyrights to "Eleanor" as a "character", including its various body styles and likenesses, and filed lawsuits preventing unlicensed "Eleanor" look-a-likes or copies of the 1967 Ford Mustang fastback, including a 2008 case against Carroll Shelby, which she won. These lawsuits sparked controversy among many in the car community, but in a 2022 lawsuit between Halicki and the Shelby Trust, the United States District Court for the Central District of California invalidated these claims, ruling that the assertion that Eleanor was a distinctive character was "an invention of overzealous advocacy", and that the car was "not entitled to standalone copyright protection as a matter of law".

Fusion Motor Company of Chatsworth, California holds a license for Halicki-approved Eleanor reproductions.

References

External links
 When Mustangs Become Movie Stars: The Story of Eleanor

Fictional cars
Ford Mustang
Cars designed and produced for films
Film characters introduced in 1974